Brasserie de Silly is a brewery located in the town of Silly (Belgium). The brewery was founded in 1850. The brewery was founded in 1850 in a farm called the Cense de la Tour. It was then called the Meynsbrughen brewery.

List of beers 

 La Divine : a blond abbey style beer, 9.5% ABV
 Double Enghien Blonde : a strong blond beer, 7.5% ABV 
 Double Enghien Brune : a strong amber beer, 8.0% ABV 
 Enghien Noel : a Christmas beer, 9.0% ABV
 Pink Killer : a grapefruit beer, 5.0% ABV 
 Abbaye de Forest : a blond triple ale, 6.5% ABV
 Saison Silly : a saison beer, 5.0% ABV
 Scotch Silly : a dark scotch style beer, 7.5% ABV
 Silly Pils : a pils beer, 5.0% ABV
 Super 64 : an amber beer, 5.0% ABV
 Titje : a white beer, 5.0% ABV

This list is not all-inclusive as the Brasserie de Silly makes a number of other beers. Some of them are seasonal varieties
while others come and go depending on sales.

References

External links 
 Homepage of Brasserie de Silly
 Main source of Silly Beer
 Brasserie de Silly  Brewery details from BeerTourism.com

Silly
Companies based in Hainaut (province)